The 2005 Tour de Suisse was the 69th edition of the Tour de Suisse road cycling stage race and was held from 11 June to 19 June 2005. The race started in Schaffhausen and finished in Ulrichen. Australian Michael Rogers was not able to defend his lead on the last day against Aitor González's attack.

Teams
Twenty teams of eight riders started the race:

Route

Stages

Stage 1
11 June 2005 - Schaffhausen to Weinfelden,

Stage 2
12 June 2005 - Weinfelden,  (ITT)

Stage 3
13 June 2005 - Abtwil/Säntiskpark to St Anton am Arlberg,

Stage 4
14 June 2005 - Vaduz to Bad Zurzach,

Stage 5
15 June 2005 - Bad Zurzach to Altdorf,

Stage 6
16 June 2005 - Bürglen to Arosa,

Stage 7
17 June 2005 - Einsiedeln to Lenk,

Stage 8
18 June 2005 - Lenk to Verbier,

Stage 9
19 June 2005 - Ulrichen,

Final standings
General classification

Points classification

Mountains classification

Sprint classification

Team classification

References

External links
Race website

2005
Tour de Suisse
Tour de Suisse